Jurnal FM is a Moldovan radio station owned by NGO Sănătatea. Jurnal FM started its broadcasting in 2009
as an internet radio station. Starting 25 December 2010, Jurnal FM broadcasts via FM in Chisinau and in other important cities of Moldova. Jurnal FM replaced the old radio station called: `Radio Sănătatea` . Currently Jurnal FM broadcasts news, entertainment and talk show programmes. The format is CHR including 50% Moldovan and 50% Romanian music. Jurnal FM is a highly rated radio station in Chisinau.

FM Broadcasts
 Chişinău - 100.1 MHz,
 Edineţ - 107.9 MHz,
 Şoldaneşti - 99.1 MHz,
 Sângerei - 95.2 MHz,
 Teleneşti - 88.2 MHz,
 Ustia (Dubăsari) - 98.7 MHz

External links
 JurnalFM official site
 JurnalFM on Facebook

Romanian-language radio stations in Moldova
Mass media in Chișinău